Marisol Conejos Panotes (January 20, 1946April 29, 2022), also known as Ate Toots Panotes, was a Filipina politician who served as Congresswoman in Camarines Norte's 2nd District from 2016 until her death in 2022.

Panotes was a graduate of the University of the East in Manila. Before entering politics, she was a legal assistant of the Federation of the Free Workers and later the researcher and general manager of Panotes Law and Accounting Office.

Panotes died on April 30, 2022 at the age of 76.

References 

1946 births
2022 deaths
21st-century Filipino politicians
People from Camarines Norte
21st-century Filipino women politicians
University of the East alumni